In mathematics, the Chihara–Ismail polynomials are a family of orthogonal polynomials introduced by , generalizing the van Doorn polynomials introduced by  and the Karlin–McGregor polynomials. They have a rather unusual measure, which is discrete except for a single limit point at 0 with jump 0, and is non-symmetric, but whose support has an infinite number of both positive and negative points.

References

Orthogonal polynomials